The Marshallville Commercial District in Marshallville, Georgia is a  historic district which was listed on the National Register of Historic Places in 1980.

It includes 15 contributing buildings and runs along Main Street in Marshallville.

All of the buildings are one- and two-story brick buildings.

It was deemed notable as "a cohesive group of Victorian commercial buildings. Although none are outstanding individually, collectively they gain significance as a well-preserved architectural group typical of rural communities."

Three more significant ones are:
Johnson's Farm Service, formerly the Central of Georgia Depot
Garrett's Pharmacy, formerly the Citizen's Bank
Elberta Hotel

References

Historic districts on the National Register of Historic Places in Georgia (U.S. state)
National Register of Historic Places in Macon County, Georgia
Victorian architecture in Georgia (U.S. state)
Romanesque Revival architecture in Georgia (U.S. state)
Buildings and structures completed in 1851